Gongsun Kang ( 200s to 210s) was a Chinese military general, politician, and warlord who lived during the late Eastern Han dynasty. He became a vassal of the state of Cao Wei in the early Three Kingdoms period.

Life
Gongsun Kang was a son of Gongsun Du, the Administrator of Liaodong appointed by the Han central government. In 204, he inherited his father's appointment and controlled the territories of Liaodong, Xuantu and Lelang commanderies. He was nominally subject to the Han chancellor Cao Cao, while keeping his domain semi-independent of the central government. In December 207, when Yuan Shang and Yuan Xi fled to Liaodong after being defeated by Cao Cao's forces, Gongsun Kang killed the Yuans and sent their heads to Cao Cao.

Gongsun also defeated Yiyimo, the king of Goguryeo, at his capital and forced him to move the capital. He separated the southern half of Lelang Commandery and established Daifang Commandery in 204 to make administration more efficient. He also attacked the southern natives and forced them to submit to Han rule.

When Gongsun Kang died, his younger brother Gongsun Gong succeeded him because his sons were still young at the time. Gongsun Kang's son Gongsun Yuan took back control of Liaodong in 228.

See also
 Lists of people of the Three Kingdoms

References

 Chen, Shou (3rd century). Records of the Three Kingdoms (Sanguozhi).
 Pei, Songzhi (5th century). Annotations to Records of the Three Kingdoms (Sanguozhi zhu).

Cao Wei politicians
Cao Wei generals

Han dynasty generals
Han dynasty politicians
Han dynasty warlords